The 1989 Stanley Cup playoffs, the playoff tournament of the National Hockey League (NHL) began on April 5, after the conclusion of the 1988–89 NHL season. This was the final year that all of the Division Semifinals began with teams playing the first four games in a span of five days. The playoffs concluded on May 25 with the champion Calgary Flames defeating the Montreal Canadiens 4–2 to win the Stanley Cup Finals four games to two.

It remains the last time that the Cup Finals was contested between two Canadian hockey teams. Montreal finished the regular season with 115 points, only two behind the league leader Calgary. They had last faced each other in 1986, with Montreal winning in five games. Calgary was only the second opposing team in NHL history to win a Stanley Cup at the Montreal Forum (the New York Rangers defeated the Montreal Maroons in 1928) and the first and only to do so against the Canadiens. Flames defenceman Al MacInnis won the Conn Smythe Trophy as playoff MVP, while Lanny McDonald, who ended the regular season with exactly 500 goals, got his name on the Cup in his last NHL game. Flames co-owner Sonia Scurfield became the first Canadian woman to have her name inscribed on the Stanley Cup.

Wayne Gretzky and the Los Angeles Kings met the defending champion Oilers in the first round. Gretzky and the Kings defeated the defending Stanley Cup champions after falling behind 3–1. However, they were swept by the eventual champion Calgary Flames in four games the next round.

Philadelphia Flyers goaltender Ron Hextall became the first goaltender to actually score a goal in the playoffs, a shorthanded, empty-net goal in Game 5 of the Patrick Division Semifinal against the Washington Capitals. One round later, Mario Lemieux equaled four NHL-records (most goals in a game, most goals in a period, most points in a game, and most points in a period) by scoring five goals and eight points in a 10–7 Pittsburgh win in game five of the Patrick Division Finals. Hextall then made headlines in the Wales Conference Finals, attacking Montreal's Chris Chelios in the late stages of Game 6 as retribution for Chelios' unpenalized hit on Flyers forward Brian Propp in game one. Hextall received a 12-game suspension at the start of the 1989–90 season for his actions.

Former Flyers head coach Mike Keenan led Chicago to the Campbell Conference finals in his first year behind the bench. The Blackhawks had 66 points, the fewest points of any playoff team this season yet they upset first place Detroit and then St. Louis before losing to Calgary.

Playoff seeds

The following teams qualified for the playoffs:

Prince of Wales Conference

Adams Division
 Montreal Canadiens, Adams Division champions, Prince of Wales Conference regular season champions – 115 points
 Boston Bruins – 88 points
 Buffalo Sabres – 83 points
 Hartford Whalers – 79 points

Patrick Division
 Washington Capitals, Patrick Division champions – 92 points
 Pittsburgh Penguins – 87 points
 New York Rangers – 82 points
 Philadelphia Flyers – 80 points

Clarence Campbell Conference

Norris Division
 Detroit Red Wings, Norris Division champions – 80 points
 St. Louis Blues – 78 points
 Minnesota North Stars – 70 points
 Chicago Blackhawks – 66 points

Smythe Division
 Calgary Flames, Smythe Division champions, Clarence Campbell Conference regular season champions, Presidents' Trophy winners – 117 points
 Los Angeles Kings – 91 points
 Edmonton Oilers – 84 points
 Vancouver Canucks – 74 points

Playoff bracket

Division Semifinals

Prince of Wales Conference

(A1) Montreal Canadiens vs. (A4) Hartford Whalers

This was the fourth playoff series meeting between these two teams, and were meeting for the second straight year. Montreal won all three previous meetings, including last year's Adams Division Semifinals in six games.

(A2) Boston Bruins vs. (A3) Buffalo Sabres

This was the fourth playoff series meeting between these two teams, and were meeting for the second straight year. Boston won all three previous meetings, including last year's Adams Division Semifinals in six games.

(P1) Washington Capitals vs. (P4) Philadelphia Flyers

This was the second straight and third overall playoff series between these two teams. Washington won both prior meetings, including last year's Patrick Division Semifinals in seven games.

(P2) Pittsburgh Penguins vs. (P3) New York Rangers

This was the first playoff series between these two teams.

Clarence Campbell Conference

(N1) Detroit Red Wings vs. (N4) Chicago Blackhawks

This was the 12th playoff series between these two teams. Chicago lead the all-time meetings 6–5. Detroit won their most recent meeting in a four-game sweep in the 1987 Norris Division Semifinals.

(N2) St. Louis Blues vs. (N3) Minnesota North Stars

This was the eighth playoff series meeting between these two teams. St. Louis won four of the prior seven meetings. The most recent meeting was won by St. Louis 3–2 in the 1986 Norris Division Semifinals.

(S1) Calgary Flames vs. (S4) Vancouver Canucks

This was the fourth playoff series meeting between these two teams. Calgary won two of the previous three meetings, including their most recent meeting 3–1 in the 1984 Smythe Division Semifinals. 

Calgary defeated Vancouver in seven games. This was the first of three consecutive series between these two teams that ended in overtime of game seven (with the winner of all three series making it to the Stanley Cup Finals). The seventh game went into overtime with both teams having great chances to win the game. The best of these chances was a breakaway for Canucks' captain Stan Smyl who was stopped by Calgary goaltender Mike Vernon. Joel Otto scored the series winner at 19:21 of the first overtime after Jim Peplinski banked it in off Otto's skate to send the Flames into the Smythe Division Final.

(S2) Los Angeles Kings vs. (S3) Edmonton Oilers

This was the fourth playoff series meeting between the Oilers and Kings, and the first since Wayne Gretzky was traded to the Kings. Edmonton won two of the past three playoff series, including the most recent in the 1987 Smythe Division Semifinals in five games.

Division Finals

Prince of Wales Conference

(A1) Montreal Canadiens vs. (A2) Boston Bruins

This was the 24th playoff series between these two teams. Montreal lead 20–3 in all-time playoff meetings. Boston won last year's Adams Division Finals in five games.

(P2) Pittsburgh Penguins vs. (P4) Philadelphia Flyers

This was the first playoff series between these two teams.

In Game 5, Mario Lemieux, listed as questionable before the game due to his neck, tied four NHL playoff records for goals in one period (4), goals in a game (5), points in a game (8) and points in a period (4).

Clarence Campbell Conference

(N2) St. Louis Blues vs. (N4) Chicago Blackhawks

This was the sixth playoff meeting between these two teams, and were meeting for the second straight year. Chicago has won four of the previous five meetings. St. Louis won last year's Norris Division Semifinals in five games.

(S1) Calgary Flames vs. (S2) Los Angeles Kings

This was the second consecutive and fourth overall playoff meeting between these two teams; with Los Angeles winning two of the three previous series. They met in last year's Smythe Division Semifinals, which Calgary won in five games.

Conference Finals

Prince of Wales Conference Final

(A1) Montreal Canadiens vs. (P4) Philadelphia Flyers

This was the fourth playoff meeting between these two teams. Montreal won two of the previous three playoff series. Philadelphia won the most recent meeting in six games in the 1987 Prince of Wales Conference Final.

Clarence Campbell Conference Final

(S1) Calgary Flames vs. (N4) Chicago Blackhawks

This was the second playoff meeting between these two teams. Calgary won the only previous meeting in a three-game sweep in the 1981 Preliminary Round.

Stanley Cup Finals

This was the second playoff series between these two teams, with the only previous meeting being the 1986 Stanley Cup Finals where Montreal defeated Calgary in five games. This was the Flames second appearance in the Finals, while Montreal was making their thirty-third appearance in the Finals. Calgary was trying to win their first Stanley Cup in franchise history, while Montreal last won the Stanley Cup in 1986.

The Stanley Cup Finals was decided between the two teams with the best records of the 1988–89 NHL regular season. Co-captain Lanny McDonald scored the second Flames goal in game six. This turned out to be the last goal in his Hockey Hall of Fame career, as he retired during the following off-season. Doug Gilmour scored two goals in the third period, including the eventual game and Cup winner to cement their first title for the Flames.

To date this remains the last all-Canadian Cup Finals.

Player statistics

Skaters
These are the top ten skaters based on points.

Goaltenders
This is a combined table of the top five goaltenders based on goals against average and the top five goaltenders based on save percentage, with at least 420 minutes played. The table is sorted by GAA, and the criteria for inclusion are bolded.

Notes

See also
List of Stanley Cup champions

playoffs
Stanley Cup playoffs